Tamara Toles O'Laughlin is an environmental activist, climate strategist, and the CEO and president of the Environmental Grantmakers Association.

Early life and education 
Toles O'Laughlin is from Brooklyn, New York. She was an undergraduate student at the City University of New York, where she majored in political science. She attended the Vermont Law School for her graduate studies, where she graduated with a Juris Doctor and a Masters Degree in Environmental Law and Policy.

Career 
As a student at City College (CUNY), she worked as an intern at the Advisory Council on Historic Preservation, The Environmental protection agency. During graduate school at Vermont Law School she was an unpaid intern at the Center on Race, Poverty and Environment, and a summer law fellow at the Natural Resources Defense Council.

After graduating from Vermont Law with a Juris Doctor and Master in Environmental Law and Policy, Toles O’Laughlin worked for the Maryland Energy Administration and District Department of Energy and Environment in Washington, DC. She served as the Senior Law Clerk to the Honorable Douglas A. Brady, and the Senior Sitting Judge Julio A. Brady at the Superior Court of the US Virgin Islands on St. Croix.

In 2014, Toles O’Laughlin (then Toles) was appointed to the Executive Board of EcoWomen. She closed a six year term at the DC chapter of EcoWomen in late 2019. During her tenure, she held several positions, including vice president of professional development, where she produced the organization's signature salon and monthly educational forum EcoHour. She closed her term as the Board Chair during the final two years.

She served on the board of the Maryland Climate Coalition.

Toles O'Laughlin is the former Chair of the Metropolitan Washington Council of Governments: Air and Climate Public Advisory Committee, where she advocated for meaningful engagement and responsive public resources. She recently concluded her term as the Chair of the Board of Directors for Women's Voices for the Earth, an organization based in Missoula, Montana, where she supported science based advocacy that gives voice to women fighting  to protect their health from toxic chemicals. She is a senior advisor and former co-chair of the Green Leadership Trust.

Toles O'Laughlin was appointed as Executive Director of the Maryland Environmental Health Network in February 2017, where she worked to eliminate environmental threats to human health. She created the Baltimore City Climate Resolution, which upholds the Paris Agreement and calls for 100% renewable energy use in Baltimore by 2050. It encourages the development of wind technology and disincentivizes incineration. The resolution was passed in June 2017. In 2018 she was awarded the Vermont Law School Social Justice Scholars Alumni Award.

In Maryland, she co-founded the Healthy Green Maryland Amendment Initiative to define healthy communities and provide multi-generational protections to defend against disproportionate climate impacts in the Maryland constitution. She also created the Baltimore City Climate Resolution, which passed in the City Council unanimously in response to the US withdrawal from the Paris Climate Accords.

During her time leading the Maryland Environmental Health Network, she created an annual environmental justice digest intended to provide statewide policy analysis through the lenses of equity, access, and justice. She also developed an educational webinar series on human health and environmental impacts on issues such as community solar, transportation, and natural gas infrastructure, which featured the experiences of impacted community members.

In 2019, O'Laughlin joined 350.org as the North America Director making her the first African-American woman to hold this position in an environment or climate organization. A signature of Toles O'Laughlin's work is the identification of systemic challenges and development of resources to rebuild with vulnerable populations.

In 2021, Toles O’Laughlin joined the Environmental Grantmakers Association (EGA) as its CEO and President. EGA represents over 200 foundations globally, holding approximately $200 billion in assets and giving more than $1.9 billion annually to environmental causes. In 2021, Toles O’Laughlin launched Climate Critical, a global support intervention for workers in environment and climate. Climate Critical is a non profit  community space for creative practice, led by movement practitioners to develop strategy and tactics, and enable radical as a essential investment for climate survival.

Toles O'Laughlin has written for Rolling Stone, The Nation, Yes! magazine and Grist. She is a contributor to Politico‘s Long Game Forum on issues of environment, equity, energy access and climate justice.

References 

American women environmentalists
American environmentalists
African-American people
Living people
Year of birth missing (living people)
21st-century American women